Margaret Gray (1913–2010) was a teacher and school head.

Margaret or Maggie Gray may also refer to:
Margaret Troup Gray (1849–1921), teacher, translator and missionary
Maggie Kingsley, real name Margaret Gray, writer
Maggie Gray, English set decorator

See also
Margaret Grey